Westwood Cemetery is one of the oldest cemeteries in Kalkaska County, Michigan, dating back to the early 19th century.   It was originally intended for the Westwood family, but is today a public cemetery.

Cemeteries in Michigan
Protected areas of Kalkaska County, Michigan
1867 establishments in Michigan